Gelderland, also known as Guelders in English, is a province of the Netherlands, occupying the centre-east of the country. Gelderland shares borders with six other provinces (Flevoland, Limburg, North Brabant, Overijssel, South Holland and Utrecht) and the German state of North Rhine-Westphalia.

The capital is Arnhem (pop. 159,265); however, Nijmegen (pop. 176,731) and Apeldoorn (pop. 162,445) are both larger municipalities. Other major regional centres in Gelderland are Ede, Doetinchem, Zutphen, Harderwijk, Tiel, Wageningen, Zevenaar, and Winterswijk. Gelderland had a population of 2,084,478 as of November 2019. It contains the Netherlands's largest forest region (the Veluwe), the Rhine and other major rivers, and a significant amount of orchards in the south (Betuwe).

History 
Historically, the province dates from states of the Holy Roman Empire and takes its name from the nearby German city of Geldern.  According to the Wichard saga, the Lords of Pont named the city, who fought and killed a dragon in 878 AD. They named the town they founded after the death rattle of the dragon: "Gelre!"

The County of Guelders arose out of the Frankish pagus Hamaland in the 11th century around castles near Roermond and Geldern. The counts of Gelre acquired the Betuwe and Veluwe regions and, through marriage, the County of Zutphen. Thus the counts of Guelders laid the foundation for a territorial power that, through control of the Rhine, Waal, Meuse and IJssel rivers, was to play an important role in the later Middle Ages. The geographical position of their territory dictated the external policy of the counts during the following centuries; they were committed to the interests of the Holy Roman Empire and to expansion south and west.

Further enlarged by the acquisition of the imperial city of Nijmegen in the 13th century, the countship was raised to a duchy in 1339 by the Holy Roman Emperor Louis IV. After 1379, the duchy was ruled from Jülich and by the counts of Egmond and Cleves. The duchy resisted Burgundian domination, but William, Duke of Jülich-Cleves-Berg was forced to cede it to Charles V in 1543, after which it formed part of the Burgundian-Habsburg hereditary lands.

The duchy revolted with the rest of the Netherlands against Philip II of Spain and joined the Union of Utrecht (1579). After the deposition of Philip II, its sovereignty was vested in the States of Gelderland, and the princes of Orange were stadtholders. In 1672, the province was temporarily occupied by Louis XIV and, in 1713, the southeastern part, including the ducal capital of Geldern, fell to Prussia. Part of the Batavian Republic (1795–1806), of Louis Bonaparte’s Kingdom of Holland (1806–10), and of the French Empire (1810–13), Gelderland became a province of the Kingdom of the Netherlands in 1815.

During the Second World War, it saw heavy fighting between Allied Paratroopers, British XXX Corps and the German II SS Panzer Corps, at the Battle of Arnhem.

Culture
In Gelderland there are many museums, like the Netherlands Open Air Museum and Museum Arnhem in Arnhem, Valkhof Museum in Nijmegen, the Het Loo Palace in Apeldoorn and in Otterlo the Kröller-Müller Museum. There are several large theatres in Gelderland such as the Stadsschouwburg in Nijmegen, Stadstheater in Arnhem and Orpheus (theater) in Apeldoorn. Some cities are also equipped with large concert halls like MUSIS (formerly: Musis sacrum) in Arnhem and Concertgebouw de Vereeniging in Nijmegen. The known by a larger public pop-music venues are Luxor Live in Arnhem, Doornroosje in Nijmegen, Gigant in Apeldoorn and the GelreDome stadium in Arnhem. Every year the municipality Renkum and Overbetuwe receive a large amount of tourist visiting because of the Battle of Arnhem. Often historical locations are visited, like the John Frost Bridge and the Arnhem Oosterbeek War Cemetery in Oosterbeek.

Geography
Gelderland can roughly be divided into four geographical regions: the Veluwe in the north, the Rivierenland including the Betuwe in the southwest, the Achterhoek (literally meaning the "back corner") or Graafschap (which originally means earldom or county) in the east and the city-region of Arnhem and Nijmegen in the centre-south.

Municipalities 

In 2020, the 51 municipalities in Gelderland were divided into four COROPs:

 Veluwe COROP group
 Apeldoorn
 Barneveld
 Ede
 Elburg
 Epe
 Ermelo
 Harderwijk
 Hattem
 Heerde
 Nijkerk
 Nunspeet
 Oldebroek
 Putten
 Scherpenzeel
 Voorst
 Wageningen
 South West Gelderland COROP group
 Buren
 Culemborg
 Maasdriel
 Neder-Betuwe
 Tiel
 West Betuwe
 West Maas en Waal
 Zaltbommel
 Achterhoek COROP group
 Aalten
 Berkelland
 Bronckhorst
 Brummen
 Doetinchem
 Lochem
 Montferland
 Oost Gelre
 Oude IJsselstreek
 Winterswijk
 Zutphen
 Arnhem & Nijmegen COROP group
 Arnhem
 Berg en Dal
 Beuningen
 Doesburg
 Druten
 Duiven
 Heumen
 Lingewaard
 Nijmegen
 Overbetuwe
 Renkum
 Rheden
 Rozendaal
 Westervoort
 Wijchen
 Zevenaar

Abolished municipalities 

These municipalities were merged with neighbouring ones:
Angerlo was merged into Zevenaar
Dinxperlo was merged into Aalten
Gorssel was merged into Lochem
Hoevelaken was merged into Nijkerk
Lichtenvoorde was merged into Groenlo (renamed Oost Gelre in 2006)
Millingen aan de Rijn and Ubbergen were merged into Groesbeek (renamed Berg en Dal in 2016)
Rijnwaarden was merged into Zevenaar
Warnsveld was merged into Zutphen
Wehl was merged into Doetinchem

These municipalities were merged and given a new name:
Bergh and Didam have become Montferland
Borculo, Eibergen, Neede and Ruurlo have become Berkelland
Geldermalsen, Lingewaal and Neerijnen have become West Betuwe
Gendringen and Wisch have become Oude IJsselstreek
Hengelo, Hummelo en Keppel, Steenderen, Vorden and Zelhem have become Bronckhorst
Elst, Heteren and Valburg have become Overbetuwe

Economy 
The gross domestic product (GDP) of the region was €78.3 billion in 2018, accounting for 10.1% of the Netherlands' economic output. GDP per capita adjusted for purchasing power was €33,000 or 110% of the EU27 average in the same year.

Religion

Cultural references 
In the 2001 movie A Knight's Tale, the protagonist, William Thatcher (played by Heath Ledger) pretends to be a knight known as "Ulrich von Lichtenstein from Gelderland".

References

External links

 Official website

 
NUTS 2 statistical regions of the European Union
Provinces of the Netherlands